Jeffrey James Marek (born Keegan Sean Laughlin, July 9, 1969) is a television personality and radio host for properties originating from Stouffville, Ontario, Canada. Jeff has hosted Live Audio Wrestling, Leafs Lunch (cohosted with former Toronto Maple Leaf executive Bill Watters) and The Jeff Marek Show, as well as making notable television appearances on TSN Off The Record and Leafs TV After the Horn. On October 1, 2007, he started as the host of Hockey Night in Canada Radio, signing a one-year contract with Sirius Satellite Radio in mid-August, 2007. As of July 6, 2011, Marek works with Sportsnet. He is the host of Hockey Central and also hosts The CHL on Sportsnet. Between 2014 and 2016 he occasionally hosted Hockey Night in Canada games that were played in the morning.

Career 

Jeff started out by hosting Live Audio Wrestling, the first wrestling/MMA program available on conventional radio. During the early days of the radio show he got the nickname "Gentleman" Jeff Marek. In 2003, after The LAW had moved from The Fan 590 to Talk 640, Jeff began to host the pre-game and post-game shows for Toronto Maple Leafs telecasts, leading to Jeff leaving The LAW, to work full-time on his other on-air and behind the scenes roles at the recently rebranded Mojo Radio - Talk Radio For Guys. Eventually, Jeff would begin to host a daily talk show on the Toronto Maple Leafs in the afternoon, known as Leafs Lunch. He also hosted his own radio show which aired after Leafs Lunch, called The Jeff Marek Show, until Mojo Radio rebranded its station AM 640 - Toronto Radio. In the summer of 2007, Marek became the sole-host of Leafs Lunch, as well as co-host of The Bill Watters Show, the afternoon-drive program on the station hosted by his former Leafs Lunch partner, former Maple Leafs Assistant GM Bill Watters.

On September 7, 2007, Jeff Marek announced that he had accepted a position at Hockey Night in Canada, hosting broadcasts on Sirius Satellite Radio channel 122. Marek signed a one-year contract, which involved him vacating his positions at AM 640 Toronto Radio. His new show began on October 1, 2007, airing from 4-6 pm. The show expanded to a three-hour program the following season. Easily one of the most popular sports shows on Sirius-XM, HNIC Radio with Jeff Marek offers a wide variety of hockey insiders and CBC's Hockey Night in Canada personalities like Kelly Hrudey, Craig Simpson and Cassie Campbell. Moreover, as part of his new duties, Jeff also works with the CBC in their broadcasts of Hockey Night in Canada, he helped debut the I-Desk in the Spring of 2009 with Hockey Hall of Fame sports writer Scott Morrison.. Additionally, Marek continues his position as an on-air personality for Leafs TV broadcasts of Maple Leaf hockey.

Marek called Judo at the 2008 Summer Olympics for CBC.

On July 6, 2011, it was announced that Marek has joined Sportsnet.

Marek left Hockey Night in Canada Radio during the Summer of 2011.

Marek was a co-host on the podcast Marek vs. Wyshynski with Yahoo's Greg Wyshynski for 6 years, ending when Wyshynski moved from Yahoo to ESPN. In the 2021–22 season, Marek was replaced by Caroline Cameron as studio host of Sportsnet's Wednesday Night Hockey, but continues to serve as an inside reporter for the network. He also co-hosts the Sportsnet-produced podcast 32 Thoughts with Elliotte Friedman.

Personal life
Jeff was adopted. He has since reconnected with his biological mother; however, he has never met his biological father. On the January 5th, 2016 podcast episode of Marek Vs Wyshynski, Jeff declared his desire to find his biological father but didn't know where to begin.

He's married to Claire, and has two sons, Brody and T.J. He has been a vegan since 2008.

References

External links 
MySpace page
Jeff Marek's former radio program: Live Audio Wrestling
Announcement of Marek's transition to HNIC Radio

Olympic Games broadcasters
1969 births
Canadian sports talk radio hosts
Living people
People from Whitchurch-Stouffville
National Hockey League broadcasters
American Hockey League broadcasters